Chloé Cruchaudet (born 2 November 1976 in Lyon, France) is a French comic book illustrator, author and colorist.

Early life 
Chloé Cruchaudet studied at the Émile-Cohl School in Lyon and then at the Gobelins School in Paris, where she studied animation.

Career 
She committed to the field at the beginning of her career. She worked on series and animated films, notably Ernest and Celestine and Have you ever seen..., while developing personal projects.

In 2006, she entered the world of comics. She participated in the collective album Les Enfants Sauvés, released by Delcourt in November of 2008. In 2009, she launched the Ida series, which details in three volumes the adventures of a thirty-year-old hypochondriac and authoritarian spinster who discovers a passion for travel. At the same time, she participated in the project Les Autres Gens brings together multiple artists around scriptwriter Thomas Cadène, who was the initiator of this comic book project.

In February 2016, Chloé refused her nomination in the Order of Arts and Letters, as did three other comic book authors.

In 2017 she began teaching at Émile Cohl school in Lyon.

Mauvais genre 
In September 2013, she released Mauvais genre based on the essay "La Garçonne et l'Assassin" by Fabrice Virgili and Danièle Voldman. The book was well received by critics and earned awards:
 Landerneau BD (2013)
 Coup de cœur at Quai des Bulles festival
 Critics' Award of the Association of Comic Book Critics and Journalists,
 Cultura Audience Award at the Angoulême International Comics Festival (2014)

Recognition 

 René Goscinny prize (2008)

Bibliography 
 La Fête foraine de Gus, Balivernes éditions, 2006 
 Joséphine Baker, Nocturne, coll. « BD Chanson », 2006
 Groenland Manhattan, Delcourt, 2008 
 « Gargantua versus Alice », in Rendez-vous, Akileos, 2008
 Participation in Enfants sauvés (dessin), avec Philippe Thirault (scénario), Delcourt, 2008
 « Mon chat à moi 5 », in Mon chat à moi, Delcourt, 2008
 Ida, Delcourt :

 Grandeur et Humiliation, 2009 
 Candeur et Abomination, 2011 
 Stupeur et Révélation, 2013 
 Participation in Autres Gens, volumes 2 and 3 (drawing), with Thomas Cadène (scenario), Dupuis, 2011
 Mauvais Genre, Delcourt, 2013 
 La Poudre d'escampette, Delcourt, 2015
 L'Herbier sauvage, Soleil Productions, 2016
 La Belle et la Bête, Gallimard jeunesse, 2018
 La croisade des innocents, Soleil, coll. Noctambule, 2018 
 Les belles personnes, Soleil, coll. Noctambule, 2020 
 Céleste : « Bien sûr, monsieur Proust. » - Première partie, Éditions Soleil, 2022

References

1976 births
French comics artists
French female comics artists
French comics writers
Artists from Lyon
Living people